Live: Bad Kitty Board Mix is a 2006 live album by Sophie B. Hawkins recorded at The Triple Door (Seattle, USA) and The Basement (Sydney, Australia).

Track listing
All songs written by Sophie B. Hawkins and recorded at The Triple Door except where stated.

CD1
"Mysteries We Understand" – 3:49
"California Here I Come" – 5:24
"Before I Walk on Fire" – 5:32
"Saviour Child" – 4:59
"As I Lay Me Down" – 6:25
"Did We Not Choose Each Other" – 4:23 (The Basement)
"Walking on Thin Ice" – 4:22 (The Basement)
"Sweetsexywoman" – 12:27
"Lose Your Way" – 5:08

Enhanced feature: Tour diary

CD2
"No Connection" – 4:30
"Bare the Weight of Me" – 6:12
"Mr Tugboat Hello" – 2:56
"Beautiful Girl" – 3:30
"Feeling Good" (Bricusse, Newley) – 9:47
"Damn I Wish I Was Your Lover" – 7:51
"I Want You" (Bob Dylan) – 9:41

Bonus tracks
"As I Lay Me Down" – 5:02 (The Basement)
"Feeling Good" (Bricusse, Newley) – 9:20 (The Basement)

Sophie B. Hawkins albums
2006 live albums